Wickliffe is a census-designated place (CDP) in Mayes County, Oklahoma, United States. The population was 99 at the 2000 census, which declined to 75 in 2010, a drop of 25 percent.

Geography
Wickliffe is located at  (36.296196, -95.105566).

Demographics

As of the census of 2000, there were 99 people, 34 households, and 29 families residing in the CDP. The population density was 85.4 people per square mile (33.0/km2). There were 37 housing units at an average density of 31.9/sq mi (12.3/km2). The racial makeup of the CDP was 49.49% White, 41.41% Native American, 1.01% Asian, and 8.08% from two or more races.

There were 34 households, out of which 55.9% had children under the age of 18 living with them, 67.6% were married couples living together, 2.9% had a female householder with no husband present, and 14.7% were non-families. 14.7% of all households were made up of individuals, and 8.8% had someone living alone who was 65 years of age or older. The average household size was 2.91 and the average family size was 3.24.

In the CDP, the population was spread out, with 35.4% under the age of 18, 9.1% from 18 to 24, 25.3% from 25 to 44, 18.2% from 45 to 64, and 12.1% who were 65 years of age or older. The median age was 30 years. For every 100 females, there were 106.3 males. For every 100 females age 18 and over, there were 120.7 males.

The median income for a household in the CDP was $26,964, and the median income for a family was $40,625. Males had a median income of $35,833 versus $16,250 for females. The per capita income for the CDP was $11,097. There were 19.5% of families and 12.8% of the population living below the poverty line, including 17.0% of under eighteens and none of those over 64.

References

Census-designated places in Mayes County, Oklahoma
Census-designated places in Oklahoma